Yitzhak Yaakov Rabinovich (1854–1919), known also as reb Itzele Ponevezher, was an Orthodox rabbi, supporter of socialist ideas and founder of the Ponevezh Yeshiva.

Biography 
Yitzhak Yaakov Rabinovich was born in 1854 in Shereshevo, Belorussia in a wealth family of merchant. He received private education of Talmud and at the age of 14 moved out of home to Selets in order to study with Yeruham Perlman — who later became noted rabbi of Minsk. A few years later Rabinovich, together with Chaim Soloveitchik moved to Brest-Litovsk. While studying together two of them developed new method of studying Talmud: by logic and deep understanding of text - in contrast to the previously long-used method of pilpul (casuistry).

In 1889, Rabinovich was appointed a teacher at the Slobodka yeshiva. However, due to challenges in accepting Musar ideology that the school followed, he left in 1894 and became a rabbi in Gorzd, Lithuania. Two years later (in 1896) he has settled in Ponevezh taking rabbi position in town. He took this position after Eliyahu David Rabinowitz-Teomim, the father-in-law of Avraham Yitzhak Kook.

In 1909 he received a substantial amount of money from Moscow Jew, Liba Miriam Gavronskii, daughter of Kalonymus Wissotzky - tea magnate, who wanted to commemorate her husband by opening religious school for promising male students. The money was sufficient to open a kollel, however its popularity, high level of studying but also amount of received grant made it possible to turn this kollel to a yeshiva. Rabinovich held the position of rosh yeshiva at this Ponevezh yeshiva.

Rabinovich found it difficult to fund-raise - which was one of the traditional tasks of head of yeshiva. That is why in 1913 he refused the offer to become head of Etz Haim Yeshiva in Jerusalem. In yeshiva in Ponevezh, which was offering generous scholarships to its students, he had not had the problem of fundraising as the yeshiva had its own founding sponsor.

Rabinovich is considered progressive in his social and public affairs opinions. In 1910 at the rabbinical congress in Saint Petersburg he supported a resolution which demanded rabbis in Russian empire to know the local language of the country. In 1912 he has supported the newly established Orthodox party Agudat Israel and was elected to the rabbinical council of the party.

After lecture of Capital by Karl Marx, Rabinovich turned to further support working class. In 1917, at the meeting of Masoret ve-Herut (Orthodox leaders), he proposed a resolution to endorse redistribution of land to peasants. However his proposal did not reach enough support to be accepted by the meeting.

In his teachings and halachic rulings he gained wide support and respect, nevertheless he never published his responsa and novellae. Some of them were preserved by his students and in letters his correspondents received.

In 1915, Rabinovich with his students were forced (by approaching Germans and by Russian policy towards Jews) to flee to Latvia and then to Ukraine. After the end of World War I, in 1919 he returned to Ponevezh, but due to Bolshevik's ruling in the town, he was unable to teach nor to re-establish his yeshiva.
Soon after that, that is on Friday 21 Adar I 5679 (that is: 21 February 1919), he died of typhus.

Heritage 
His work and teachings found followers and outlived him. At the end of 1919, when Ponevezh returned to Lithuania, the Ponevezh yeshiva was re-opened with Yosef Shlomo Kahaneman as its rosh yeshiva and soon regained its prestige. Under Kahaneman's leadership the school incorporated Musar but the teaching curriculum still focused on the study of Talmud. Kahandeman was considered not only a respected Talmudist but also very effective in fundraising - both locally and in United States. The funds he gathered were mostly used on improving school facilities. The outbreak of World War II caught Kahaneman during his trip to British Mandate Palestine, where he decided to stay. However, he continued running the yeshiva from abroad. Students were able to continue their studies, even after the Red Army entrance to town, seizing the yeshiva's original building and several allocations of yeshiva in different synagogues in town. The situation dramatically changed after German Nazis entered the town in June 1941. The school building was incorporated into the part of town that was turned into a ghetto and yeshiva students were murdered only a few days after Nazi's occupation started.
In 1944, in British Mandate Palestine, in the new town of Bnei Brak, Kahaneman re-established the Ponevezh yeshiva, which is still considered one of the leading yeshivas in Israel, and main in Litvishe Jews tradition. The current yeshiva still uses the Ponevezh Yeshiva name after its original location and to commemorate the murdered community of its origin.

See also 
 Lithuanian Jews
 Ponevezh yeshiva

References 

1854 births
1919 deaths
Lithuanian Orthodox rabbis
Ponevezh Rosh yeshivas
Ponevezh Yeshiva
19th-century Lithuanian rabbis
20th-century Lithuanian rabbis